Scooby may refer to:

 Scooby-Doo (character), an animated television character also called Scooby 
 Scooby Web Calendar, the former code name for Web UI of the Cosmo Web Calendar project from the Open Source Applications Foundation
 Rhyming slang term for the Japanese car manufacturer Subaru
 Nickname of Cristián Castañeda (born 1968), Chilean retired footballer
 Nickname of Philip Scooby Wright (born 1994), American football player

See also
Scooby-Doo (disambiguation) 

Lists of people by nickname